RESNA or Resna may refer to:

  Resen, North Macedonia, the Greek name for Resen, Macedonia
  Rehabilitation Engineering and Assistive Technology Society of North America, known as RESNA